Anjy Al-Yousif is a Syrian actress. She was born in Damascus, got a degree in Performing Arts in 1981, has participated since 1990 in voice acting her several works are Captain Majid and Care Bears and Blue Blink and that was in 1990, the role of the aunt of Cinderella and Hani in the Big Race and the role of the snake in the series Argai and the role of the Amani in the series Slam Dunk.

Works

Dubbing
Digimon Adventure as Tai Kamiya, Kari Kamiya
Nadia: The Secret of Blue Water as Jean
Pretty Rhythm as Omi Harune
Romeo's Blue Skies as Angelao
Ranma ½

References

Syrian television actresses
Living people
Year of birth missing (living people)
Syrian stage actresses
People from Damascus
20th-century Syrian actresses
Syrian voice actresses